UFC 175: Weidman vs. Machida was a mixed martial arts event held on July 5, 2014, at Mandalay Bay Events Center in Las Vegas, Nevada.

Background
The event was headlined by a Middleweight Championship bout between the current champion Chris Weidman and former UFC Light Heavyweight Champion Lyoto Machida.  The bout was originally scheduled to headline UFC 173 on May 24, 2014.  However, the bout was delayed after Weidman sustained a knee injury which required a minor surgery.

A light heavyweight bout between the coaches of The Ultimate Fighter: Brazil 3 Chael Sonnen and Wanderlei Silva was originally scheduled for UFC 173. However, the fight was moved twice - first being on May 31, 2014 at The Ultimate Fighter: Brazil 3 Finale, and now was expected to be contested on this card. Silva was ultimately pulled from the fight entirely after he failed to submit an application to fight in the state of Nevada, as well as his refusal to undergo a random drug test and was replaced by Vitor Belfort.  The bout between Sonnen and Belfort was to be contested at middleweight. However, Sonnen subsequently failed his random drug test and was removed from the bout and ultimately retired from the sport. The following day it was announced by MMA writer Kevin Iole that Belfort had also been removed from the card due to the inability of the UFC finding him a new opponent.

A bout between Dan Henderson and Daniel Cormier was briefly linked to this event but was moved up to UFC 173 to bolster that event's card.

Santiago Ponzinibbio was expected to face Ildemar Alcântara but was forced out of the bout with a knee injury. He was replaced by Kenny Robertson.

During the event, Stefan Struve suffered a "near-fainting episode" and his bout with Matt Mitrione on the pay-per-view was canceled. The first fight of the main card was already happening when the news was revealed on Twitter and it was officially confirmed on the broadcast after the Brimage-Doane fight ended.

Results

Bonus awards
The following fighters were awarded $50,000 bonuses:
 Fight of the Night: Chris Weidman vs. Lyoto Machida
 Performance of the Night: Ronda Rousey and Rob Font

Reported payout
The following is the reported payout to the fighters as reported to the Nevada State Athletic Commission. It does not include sponsor money and also does not include the UFC's traditional "fight night" bonuses.
 Chris Weidman: $450,000 (includes $225,000 win bonus) def. Lyoto Machida: $200,000
 Ronda Rousey: $120,000 (includes $60,000 win bonus) def. Alexis Davis: $24,000
 Stefan Struve: $80,000 (includes $40,000 win bonus) vs. Matt Mitrione: $60,000 (includes $30,000 win bonus) ^
 Uriah Hall: $20,000 (includes $10,000 win bonus) def. Thiago Santos: $10,000
 Russell Doane: $18,000 (includes $9,000 win bonus) def. Marcus Brimage: $10,000
 Urijah Faber: $120,000 (includes $60,000 win bonus) def. Alex Caceres: $19,000
 Kenny Robertson: $28,000 (includes $14,000 win bonus) def. Ildemar Alcântara: $16,000
 Bruno Santos: $16,000 (includes $8,000 win bonus) def. Chris Camozzi: $23,000
 Rob Font: $16,000 (includes $8,000 win bonus) def. George Roop: $20,000
 Luke Zachrich: $16,000 (includes $8,000 win bonus) def. Guilherme Vasconcelos: $8,000
 Kevin Casey: $16,000 (includes $8,000 win bonus) def. Bubba Bush: $8,000

^ Fight didn't take place because of pre-fight "near-fainting episode" suffered by Struve; Although not reflected in the NSAC paperwork, both fighters still paid show/win bonuses

See also
List of UFC events
2014 in UFC

Notes

References

Ultimate Fighting Championship events
Mixed martial arts in Las Vegas
2014 in mixed martial arts